The Cameroon Renaissance Movement (MRC) is a political party in Cameroon.

History
The party was established in August 2012 by Maurice Kamto. It won a single seat in the 2013 parliamentary elections.

Six members the MRC were arrested for distributing face masks and hand sanitizers in the capital, Yaoundé on May 12, 2020. The use of face masks was obligatory during the COVID-19 pandemic.

In December 2021, around thirty executives and activists from the MRC were sentenced to prison terms for insurrection and endangering state security. The party's first vice-president Alain Fogué and Kamto's spokesman Olivier Bibou Nissack received seven-year sentences.

References

External links
Party website

Political parties in Cameroon
Political parties established in 2012
2012 establishments in Cameroon